Seyqalan, also rendered as Segelyan, may refer to:
 Seyqalan-e Varzal, Rasht County
 Seyqalan, Shaft
 Seyqalan, Sowme'eh Sara
 Seyqalan, Tulem, Sowme'eh Sara County